The Peniophoraceae are a family of fungi in the order Russulales. Species of this family have a cosmopolitan distribution and are mostly saprobic, causing rots of standing and fallen wood. According to a 2008 estimate, the family contains 7 genera and 88 species.

References

Russulales
Basidiomycota families
Taxa named by Johannes Paulus Lotsy
Taxa described in 1907